Volusia County is located in the east-central part of the U.S. state of Florida between the St. Johns River and the Atlantic Ocean. As of the 2020 census, the county was home to 553,543 people, an increase of 11.9% from the 2010 census. It was founded on December 29, 1854, from part of Orange County, and was named for the community of Volusia, located in northwestern Volusia County. Its first county seat was Enterprise. Since 1887, its county seat has been DeLand.

Volusia County is part of the Deltona–Daytona Beach–Ormond Beach metropolitan statistical area, as well as part of the larger Orlando–Deltona–Daytona Beach Combined statistical area.

History

Volusia County was named after its largest community, Volusia, when the Florida Legislature created it by dividing Orange County on December 29, 1854. At the time, Volusia County had about 600 residents.

The origins of the word "Volusia" are unclear, though  several theories exist:
 The name came from a word meaning "Land of the Euchee", from the Euchee Indians who migrated into the area after the Timucua Indian cultures declined in the early 1700s. The Euchees (or Uchees) lived in the area of Spring Gardens, about 10 miles south of Volusia.
 It was named after a British settler named Voluz, who owned a plantation located on the St. Johns River in the late 1700s.
 The name originated from the Veluche, the surname of a French or Belgian owner of the trading post in Volusia. According to some, this was during the British regime, and according to others, it was around 1818. Over time, the name Veluche became anglicized to Volusia.
 The town was established by and named for Jere Volusia.
 The settlement was named by the Spanish after the celebrated Roman jurist Volusio, who wrote 30 books and tutored Marcus Aurelius, the Roman emperor and philosopher.

The land area of present-day Volusia County was long inhabited by the indigenous Timucua and Mayaca peoples. Neither historic group exists today as distinct ethnic tribes, having been decimated by disease and war in the decades after contact with European traders and settlers. The large shell middens at Tomoka State Park and other evidence of their historic habitation can still be seen in various areas of Volusia County.

During the British occupation of Florida, a colony known as New Smyrna was started in southeast Volusia County by Andrew Turnbull. This colony was connected to St. Augustine, the capital of East Florida, via the Kings Road.

The Seminole Indians, descendants of the Creek tribe of Alabama and Georgia who resisted forced relocation to Indian Territory, also camped in various parts of Volusia County. During the Second Seminole War (1836–1842), the Seminole burned a large sugar plantation in what is today the city of Daytona Beach.

On the east shore of the St. Johns River in Volusia, in present-day DeBary, General Winfield Scott established a fort/depot in 1836 named Fort Florida.

Geography

Volusia County is bordered on the west by the St. Johns River and Lake Monroe, and by the Atlantic Ocean to the east.

Regions
The Volusia County government divides the county into three regions. This parallels the three calling regions used by BellSouth, the regional phone company:

East Volusia, also known as the greater Daytona Beach area, or the Halifax area (named for the Halifax River that runs through the area), includes the cities of Daytona Beach, Daytona Beach Shores, Holly Hill, Ormond Beach, Ponce Inlet, Port Orange, and South Daytona; and the surrounding unincorporated areas close to these cities.
Southeast Volusia,  also known as the greater New Smyrna Beach area, includes the cities of New Smyrna Beach, Edgewater, and Oak Hill; also the unincorporated areas close to these cities.
West Volusia, also called St. Johns River country (named for the St. Johns River, which lies nearby),  includes the cities of Barberville, DeBary, DeLand, DeLeon Springs, Deltona, Glenwood, Enterprise, Lake Helen, Orange City, Pierson, and Seville, and the surrounding unincorporated areas close to these cities. Deltona is the largest city in Volusia County.

Adjacent counties
 Flagler County - north
 Brevard County - south
 Seminole County - southwest
 Lake County - west
 Marion and Putnam Counties - northwest

Parks and gardens

 Addison Blockhouse Historic State Park
 Blue Spring State Park
 Bulow Creek State Park
 Canaveral National Seashore
 De Leon Springs State Park
 Dunlawton Plantation and Sugar Mill
 Gemini Springs Park
 Green Springs Park
 Hontoon Island State Park
 Lake Ashby Park
 Lake George State Forest
 Lake Woodruff National Wildlife Refuge
 North Peninsula State Park
 Ormond Beach Memorial Art Museum and Gardens
 Seminole Rest
 Smyrna Dunes Park
 Sugar Mill Ruins
 Tiger Bay State Forest
 Tomoka State Park

Rivers and waterways

 Atlantic Ocean
 Halifax River
 Intracoastal Waterway
 Lake George
 Lake Monroe
 Mosquito Lagoon
 Ponce de León Inlet
 Spruce Creek
 St. Johns River
 Tomoka River

Major attractions
 Athens Theater in DeLand
 Atlantic Center for the Arts in New Smyrna Beach
 Bongoland Ruins in Port Orange
 Daytona International Speedway in Daytona Beach
 Decommissioned DC-7 at Epic Flight Academy in New Smyrna Beach
 Jackie Robinson Ballpark in Daytona Beach
 Marine Science Center in Ponce Inlet
 Museum of Arts and Sciences (Daytona Beach)
 New Smyrna Speedway in New Smyrna Beach
 Ocean Center (convention center) in Daytona Beach
 Old Sugar Mill Grill & Griddle House in DeLeon Springs
 Ormond Memorial Art Museum & Garden in Ormond Beach
 Ponce de Leon Inlet Lighthouse and Museum in Ponce Inlet
 Skydive DeLand at DeLand Airport
 Volusia County Fair and Expo Center in DeLand
 Volusia Speedway Park in Barberville

Law and government
Under Volusia County's council-manager form of government, voters elect a county council, which consists of seven members who serve four-year terms. Five are elected by district; the county chairman and at-large representative are elected county-wide.

The county council establish ordinances and policies for the county. It also reviews and approves the county budget annually. The county council appoints a county manager, who carries out the will of the council and handles day-to-day business.

Elected officials
County commissioners:
 County chair: Jeff Brower
 Councilman-at-large: Ben Johnson
 District 1 councilwoman - Barbara Girtman
 District 2 councilwoman - Billie Wheeler
 District 3 councilwoman - Danny Robins
 District 4 councilwoman - Heather Post
 District 5 councilman and vice chair - Fred Lowry

Constitutional officers, elected county-wide:
 Sheriff - Mike Chitwood
 Clerk of the Circuit Court - Laura E. Roth
 Property Appraiser - Larry Bartlett
 Supervisor of Elections - Lisa Lewis
 Tax Collector - Will Roberts

Officers of the 7th Judicial Circuit, which includes Volusia County, elected circuit-wide:
 Chief Judge - James R. Clayton
 State Attorney - R.J. Larizza
 Public Defender - Matthew Metz
 Twenty-six other circuit judges (elected circuit-wide) and seventeen county judges (elected county-wide)

County offices
 Thomas C. Kelly Administration Center, 123 W. Indiana Ave., DeLand 32720
 Daytona Beach Administration Building, 250 N. Beach St., Daytona Beach 32114
 New Smyrna Beach Administration Office, 111 Canal St., New Smyrna Beach 32168
 Orange City Administration Office, 2744 Enterprise Rd., Orange City 32763

Justice
The county's courts operate from facilities in both DeLand and Daytona Beach. There, they preside over a variety of cases, including felonies, misdemeanors, traffic, and domestic cases in their dockets. An elected prosecutor tries cases for the public. Defendants may find representation through the office of the elected public defender.

The power of electing the county's sheriff lies with the county's residents. The county sheriff is directly responsible to the courts, but also to the state for the enforcement of state laws. The county sheriff's deputies provide law enforcement to the unincorporated areas of Volusia County, and assist the various municipal police departments, such as the Daytona Beach Police Department.

Many volunteers work alongside the paid professionals. Included are Citizen Observer Program (COP), who are volunteers working under the direction of the county sheriff and play a part in the county's policing operations.

The Volusia County Correctional Center and the Volusia County Branch Jail are both located on U.S. Highway 92, also known as International Speedway Boulevard, which is roughly equidistant between DeLand and Daytona Beach. The county's jail imprisons inmates awaiting trial, convicted offenders who have yet to be sentenced, or those who have been sentenced for a term of a year or less. Longer sentences may be served in the Florida state prison system or alternatively in the federal prison system according to the dictates of the offense.

Libraries
The county centrally controls 13 libraries, with DeLand and Daytona Beach-City Island being the largest two. Each library branch is administered by geographic region.

Collections included 869,491 books, 83,943 videos, 58,784 audio materials, 2,051 magazines and newspapers, over 100,000 government documents, and 51 licensed databases. Personal computers for public use are hooked up on broadband in all libraries. An estimated 230,000 Volusia County residents have library cards. One library card is valid at all locations, and materials are lent between locations through a daily courier service and outside the libraries by interlibrary loan. Library cards are free for all Volusia County residents.

Depending on size, the branches have different operating hours; six are open every day of the week (Ormond Beach, Daytona Beach-City Island, Port Orange, New Smyrna Beach, DeLand, and Deltona), two are open six days a week (Edgewater and DeBary), and five are open five days a week (Daytona Beach-Keech Street, Oak Hill, Pierson, Lake Helen, and Orange City).

The Volusia County Library System was officially started in 1961. Prior to 1961, there were small libraries throughout Volusia County that were maintained by different organizations prevalent in the county. In 1949, Charlotte Smith started an effort to organize the public library system within Volusia County. In 1960, 10 libraries existed in Volusia County, however they were not connected together in a centralized library system. In September 1960, state officials met with librarians and county officials to discuss how the Library Services Act could be applied to Volusia County. A committee was formed to study the conditions of the libraries within the county and determine if organizing the libraries in the county into a centralized system was an appropriate move. After a year the committee found that a countywide library system would be the best course of action for the county. With the development of the Volusia County Library System, a library board was appointed by the governor and the board hired Bradley Simon to be the first director of the Volusia County Library System. During this time, bookmobiles were purchased and sent to rural areas in Volusia County to provide residents there with library services. By 1962, nine public libraries and the bookmobiles were part of the Volusia County Library System, and within the next four years Holly Hill, Ormond Beach, and Orange City joined the system. As new funds were made available, new construction of library facilities occurred, with many of the libraries in the Volusia County Library System being granted new buildings. In 1976 the Deltona Library opened and became the only library that the county fully owned. In 1977 the Dickerson Community Center Library opened and served the black community of Daytona Beach, and is now the John H. Dickerson Heritage Library. Expansion in the 1980s included the construction of buildings for the Port Orange Regional Library in 1984, the Lake Helen Public Library and the Edgewater Public Library in 1988, and the DeLand Regional Library in 1989.

Voter registration
According to the Secretary of State's office, Republicans are a plurality of registered voters in Volusia  County.

Demographics

As of the 2020 United States census, there were 553,543 people, 220,386 households, and 136,510 families residing in the county.

As of the census of 2000,  443,343 people, 184,723 households, and 120,069 families were residing in the county. The 211,938 housing units averaged 192 per square mile (74/km2). The racial makeup of the county was 86.11% White, 9.29% African American, 0.31% Native American, 1.00% Asian, 1.86% from other races, and 1.43% from two or more races. About 6.57% of the population were Hispanic or Latino of any race; ancestry was 13.7%  German, 11.5% Irish, 11.2% English, 10.7% American, and 8.7% Italian ancestry.

Of the 184,723 households, 24.10% had children under the age of 18 living with them, 50.40% were married couples living together, 10.90% had a female householder with no husband present, and 35.00% were not families. About 27.90% of all households were made up of individuals, and 13.60% had someone living alone who was 65 years of age or older. The average household size was 2.32, and the average family size was 2.82.

In the county, the age distribution was  20.30% under 18, 8.20% from 18 to 24, 25.30% from 25 to 44, 24.20% from 45 to 64, and 22.10% at 65 or older. The median age was 42 years. For every 100 females, there were 94.50 males. For every 100 females age 18 and over, there were 91.80 males.

Males had a median income of $30,573 versus $22,471 for females. The per capita income for the county was $19,664. About 7.90% of families and 11.60% of the population were below the poverty line, including 16.30% of those under age 18 and 7.10% of those age 65 or over.

2016
As of 2016, an estimated  205,310 households were in Volusia County.  The total population was 510,806. About 86.8% spoke English as their only language, so 13.2% could speak a language other than English.  The largest ancestry groups in the county were English-American at 15.7%, German-American at 12.3%, Irish-American at 11.0% and Italian-American at 7.0%.

Economy
The overall gross metro product (GMP) for Volusia County economy increased from $12.98 billion in 2005 to $13.69 billion in 2006; a $709.9 million increase. The GMP is an annual measurement of the total economic output and sales of goods and services provided within the metropolitan statistical area that comprises all of Volusia County and its 16 cities. A GMP of $13.69 billion represents a significant circulation of new capital resources in an economy populated by just over 500,000 residents.

Local consumer confidence and a continued immigration of an estimated 28,800 new residents, new capital investments for new construction exceeding $1.11 billion, and the steady growth of professional and health-care services continued to drive much of the county's economic viability.

Volusia County's manufacturing sector maintained a steady and stable position within the local economy contrary to the declining trends being experienced elsewhere within Florida. The overall number of manufacturers present within the county increased to over 430 in 2006 and accounted for a large portion of the county's GMP. Manufacturing maintains one of the highest of all average wage levels within the county and generates a higher rate of circulation of economic impact than any other business sector that comprises the local economy.

Volusia County's manufacturing sector generated an average annual wage of $37,632 in 2006, well above the county's average annual wage of $32,200 for all workers.

Transportation

Airports

 Daytona Beach International
 DeLand Municipal Airport
 Massey Ranch Airpark
 New Smyrna Beach Municipal Airport
 Ormond Beach Municipal Airport
 Pierson Municipal Airport

Major roads

  Interstate 95 is the main north–south interstate highway along the east coast of the state. Eight interchanges exist within the county, three of them in Daytona Beach.
  Interstate 4 is the main east–west interstate highway through Central Florida, but it also serves as the westernmost interstate highway in the county. It contains at least seven interchanges and becomes State Road 400 east of I-95.
  U.S. 1 is the main local road through eastern Volusia County, running north–south. It served as the main north–south highway in the state and the eastern half of the county until I-95 was built.
  US 17 is the main local road through western Volusia County, running north–south.
  US 92, an east–west route, shares a concurrency with US 17 further south in Polk County until branching off onto the International Speedway Boulevard.
  SR A1A is the scenic coastal alternate route to US 1, which also includes some county road spurs and extensions.
  SR 40, an east–west road in northern Volusia County enters the county from the Astor Bridge over the St. Johns River and heads east towards Ormond Beach.
  SR 44, an east–west road in southern Volusia County, enters the county from the Crows Bluff Bridge over the St. Johns River and heads east towards New Smyrna Beach.
  SR 46, an east–west road on the southwestern corner of Volusia County, enters the county from the Mims Bridge over the St. Johns River and enters Brevard County with no major junctions.
  SR 5A is Nova Road, a suffixed alternate route of State Road 5, the unsigned hidden state road for US 1. It spans from Port Orange to Ormond Beach.
  SR 421 is a connecting east–west road between I-95 and the Port Orange Causeway.
  SR 11, a scenic north–south road, runs from US 17 north of DeLand to US 1 in Bunnell in Flagler County.
  SR 483, a north–south state road, it runs west of SR 5A from Port Orange to Holly Hill. It runs along the eastern border of both Daytona Beach International Airport and Daytona International Speedway.

Public transportation
Volusia County Public Transit System (VOTRAN) is the local bus service. The buses offer service throughout the county, Monday through Saturday, from 7 am to 7 pm, and is handicapped-accessible. Limited service is offered in East Volusia in the evenings and on Sundays. The cost is $1.25 per trip, $3.00 for a one-day bus pass, or $40 for a 31-day pass (valid for all VOTRAN routes).

Passenger train service to Volusia County is provided by Amtrak on the Silver Meteor and Silver Star routes.
Service between Volusia County and Orlando is provided by SunRail, a commuter rail line running from Volusia to Orange County. The initial phase of the project commenced in 2014 and extends service to as far north as DeBary. A planned expansion was to include the DeLand Amtrak station in 2015.

Education
Public primary and secondary education is handled by Volusia County Schools. One of the larger private schools is Father Lopez Catholic High School.

Middle schools

 Campbell Middle School
 Creekside Middle School
 David C. Hinson Middle School
 DeLand Middle School
 Deltona Middle School
 Galaxy Middle School
 Heritage Middle School
 Holly Hill School
 New Smyrna Beach Middle School
 Ormond Beach Middle School
 River Springs Middle School
 Silver Sands Middle School
 Southwestern Middle School
 T. Dewitt Taylor Middle High School

High schools

 Atlantic High School
 DeLand High School
 Deltona High School
 Mainland High School
 New Smyrna Beach High School
 Pine Ridge High School
 Seabreeze High School
 Spruce Creek High School
 T. Dewitt Taylor Middle High School
 University High School
 Volusia High School

Colleges and universities

 Bethune-Cookman University
 Daytona State College
 Embry-Riddle Aeronautical University
 Keiser University
 Palmer College of Chiropractic
 Stetson University
 University of Central Florida

Vocational

 Advanced Technology College
 Epic Flight Academy
 International Academy Beauty School
 Florida Technical College
 Palmer College of Chiropractic
 Phoenix East Aviation
 The Airline Academy
 WyoTech

Media

Newspapers
 The West Volusia Beacon  - online edition of news publication covering DeLand and West Volusia
 The Daytona Beach News-Journal - print and online daily newspaper covering all of Volusia County
 Orlando Sentinel - newspaper and news site based in Orlando with a bureau covering Volusia County
 The Avion Newspaper - student college publication of Embry-Riddle Aeronautical University in Daytona Beach

Television
Public broadcasting station WDSC-TV is located in Daytona Beach and broadcasts to 10 counties in Central Florida. Television station WESH is allocated to Daytona Beach - Orlando, and its transmission tower is located midway between those two. Otherwise, Volusia County is served by the major TV broadcasting stations in Orlando and Orange County.

Radio

AM

 WELE, 1380 AM, Ormond Beach, News/Talk
 WMFJ, 1450 AM, Daytona Beach, Religious
 WNDB, 1150 AM, Daytona Beach, News/Talk/Sports
 WDJZ, 1590 AM, South Daytona, Talk
 WROD, 1340 AM, Daytona Beach, Classic Rock
 WSBB, 1230 AM, New Smyrna Beach, Standards
 WTJV, 1490 AM, DeLand, Spanish Language
 WYND, 1310 AM, DeLand, Religious

FM

 WAPN, 91.5 FM, Holly Hill, Contemporary Christian
 WCFB, 94.5 FM, Daytona Beach, Urban Adult Contemporary
 WHOG-FM, 95.7 FM, Ormond-by-the-Sea, Classic Rock
 WIKD-LP, 102.5 FM, Daytona Beach, Free-Format
 WQMP, 101.9 FM, Daytona Beach, Alternative Rock
 WJLU, 89.7 FM, New Smyrna Beach, Religious
 WJLU, 97.3 FM, DeLand, Religious
 WKRO-FM, 93.1 FM, Port Orange, Country
 WKTO, 88.9 FM, Edgewater, Religious
 WLGM-LP, 93.9 FM, Edgewater
 WNUE-FM, 98.1 FM, Deltona, Spanish Adult Hits
 WOCL, 105.9 FM, DeLand, Oldies
 WVYB, 103.3 FM, Holly Hill, Top 40

Communities

Cities

 Daytona Beach
 Daytona Beach Shores
 DeBary
 DeLand
 Deltona
 Edgewater
 Holly Hill
 Lake Helen
 New Smyrna Beach
 Oak Hill
 Orange City
 Ormond Beach
 Port Orange
 South Daytona

Towns
 Pierson
 Ponce Inlet

Census-designated places

 DeLand Southwest
 De Leon Springs
 Glencoe
 North DeLand
 Ormond-by-the-Sea
 Samsula-Spruce Creek
 Seville
 West DeLand

Other unincorporated communities

 Alamana
 Allandale
 Ariel
 Bakerstown
 Barberville
 Benson Junction
 Beresford
 Bethune Beach
 Blake
 Blue Springs Landing
 Bluffton
 Boden
 Cassadaga
 Cabbage Bluff
 Connersville
 Conrad
 Cow Creek
 Creighton
 Cypress Lake Estates
 Daisy Lake
 Daytona Highridge Estates
 Daytona Park Estates
 Deadman Landing
 DeLand Highlands
 DeLeon Springs Heights
 Edgewater Junction
 Eldora
 Eldridge
 Ellinor Village
 Emporia
 Enterprise
 Farmton
 Fatio
 Fort Florida
 Glenwood
 Halifax Estates
 Harbor Oaks
 Hucomer
 Isleboro
 Kalamazoo
 Lake Ashby Shores
 Lemon Bluff
 Maytown
 Mission City
 Mound Grove
 National Gardens, Florida
 Orange City Hills
 Ortona
 Osteen
 Packwood Place
 Pennichaw
 Riverside
 Seabreeze
 Senyah
 Stone Island
 Sugar Mill Estates
 Tomoka Estates
 Valdez
 Volusia
 Wilbur By-The-Sea

See also
 National Register of Historic Places listings in Volusia County, Florida

Notes

References

External links

Volusia County government sites
 Volusia County Government
 Volusia County Online Permitting (Connect Live)
 Volusia County Economic Development
 Volusia County Eco-tourism (ECHO)
 Volusia County Library
 Volusia County Law Library
 Daytona Beach International Airport (Maintained by Volusia County)
 Volusia County Clerk of Court
 Volusia County Metropolitan Planning Organization
 Volusia County Transit (Votran)
 Volusia County Sheriff's Office
 Volusia County Supervisor of Elections
 Volusia County Property Appraiser
 Volusia County History
 Municipal Code of Ordinances
 Volusia County Public Schools

Other sites
 Connell Collection Approximately 550 photographs of Volusia County and the surrounding area taken between 1900 and 1915. From the State Library & Archives of Florida
 Volusia County Collection on the RICHES Mosaic Interface
 The Volusia Community for up to date news and information about Volusia County

 
Florida placenames of Native American origin
Charter counties in Florida
1854 establishments in Florida
Populated places established in 1854